For You I Die is a 1947 American film noir directed by John Reinhardt and starring  Cathy Downs, Paul Langton, Mischa Auer and Roman Bohnen.

Plot 
Forced to participate in a prison break, a convict on the run holes up at a roadside diner.

Cast
 Cathy Downs as Hope Novak
 Paul Langton as Johnny Coulter
 Mischa Auer as Alec Shaw
 Roman Bohnen as Smitty
 Jane Weeks as Georgie
 Marion Kerby as Maggie Dillon
 Manuela Callejo as Louisa
 Don Harvey as Gruber
 Charles Waldron, Jr. as Jerry
 Rory Mallinson as Mac
Uncredited (in order of appearance)
Tommy Noonan as hold-up man
Don Brodie as traveler at diner

References

External links

 
 
 
 
 
  (public domain)

1947 films
1947 romantic drama films
American crime drama films
American black-and-white films
Film noir
American prison films
Film Classics films
Articles containing video clips
Films scored by Paul Sawtell
1940s English-language films
1940s American films